Club Deportivo Estela is a basketball team based in Torrelavega, Cantabria, Spain.

History
Estela was founded in 1999 in Santander. In June 2011, the team tried to be promoted into one of the vacant berths in LEB Plata, but the club continues playing at Liga EBA due to a lack of funds.

However, after several years being so close to promote to LEB Plata, the club achieved a vacant berth after the expansion of the league from 16 to 24 teams.

In March 2020, the club announced the relocation from Santander to Torrelavega.

Current roster

Season by season

References

External links
Official website

Basketball teams in Cantabria
Sport in Santander, Spain
Liga EBA teams
Torrelavega